Calopteryginae is a subfamily of broad-winged damselflies in the family Calopterygidae. There are about 17 genera and more than 160 described species in Calopteryginae.

Genera
These 17 genera belong to the subfamily Calopteryginae:

 Archineura Kirby, 1894
 Atrocalopteryx Dumont et al., 2005
 Caliphaea Hagen, 1859
 Calopteryx Leach, 1815 (jewelwings)
 Echo Selys, 1853
 Iridictyon Needham & Fisher, 1940
 Sapho Selys, 1853
 Matrona Selys, 1853
 Matronoides Foerster, 1897
 Mnais Selys, 1853
 Neurobasis Selys, 1853
 Noguchiphaea Asahina, 1976
 Phaon Selys, 1853
 Psolodesmus McLachlan, 1870
 Umma Kirby, 1890
 Vestalaria May, 1935
 Vestalis Selys, 1853

References

Further reading

 
 
 
 

Calopterygidae